Nuryab (also Romanized as Nūryāb; also known as Nūr-i-Āb) is a village in Howli Rural District, in the Central District of Paveh County, Kermanshah Province, Iran. At the 2006 census, its population was 966, in 255 families.

References 

Populated places in Paveh County